Duvaliopsis is a genus of beetles in the family Carabidae, containing the following species:

 Duvaliopsis bielzi Seidlitz, 1867
 Duvaliopsis calimanensis Knirsch, 1924
 Duvaliopsis meliki Csiki, 1912
 Duvaliopsis pilosella (L.Miller, 1868)
 Duvaliopsis rybinskii Knirsch, 1924
 Duvaliopsis transsylvanica Csiki, 1902

References

Trechinae